Neuromusculoskeletal medicine (NMM) is a sub-specialty of American osteopathic medicine. The field was defined in order to recognize medical doctors who had received post-graduate medical training in the diagnosis and treatment of musculoskeletal and related neurological medical problems. Both American DOs and MDs have the option to train and practice in any of the medical specialties and sub-specialties. Neuromusculoskeletal medicine is a specialty which is dominated by DOs. MDs may also become certified, but this is rare. Physicians who go on to complete a Neuromusculoskeletal medicine residency must first complete a transitional year internship, or an accredited residency in another specialty, typically in a primary care field such as family medicine or internal medicine.

References 

Osteopathic medicine